Cannabis in Estonia is illegal, but possession of up to 7.5 grams is considered an amount for personal use, and is punished with a fine. Large amounts and distribution are criminal offences and punishable with a custodial sentence of up to 5 years. Age limit of buying cbd cannabis is 18 and you dont need any kind of prescription to buy. Age limit of using cbd products for self medication is 16 if you are younger you need medical prescription. In 2018, the then recently merged municipality of Kanepi in southern Estonia adopted the cannabis leaf as the symbol on its flag and coat of arms. Kanep is the Estonian word for cannabis. Hemp was historically used as a product in shipbuilding. It was traded from the eastern Baltic within the Hanseatic League and in the sixteenth century directly to the Netherlands for this purpose.

References

Estonia
Politics of Estonia
Society of Estonia